Once and Future King Part I is the fourth studio album released by Gary Hughes.

Track listing 
All songs written by Gary Hughes.
 "Excalibur" – 6:22
 "Dragon Island Cathedral" – 6:03
 "At the End of Day" – 4:30
 "The Reason Why" – 4:36
 "Shapeshifter" – 4:45
 "King for a Day" – 4:47
 "Avalon" – 4:00
 "Sinner" – 5:01
 "In Flames" – 5:03
 "Lies" – 5:31

Personnel

Singers-The Cast 

Damian Wilson – (Track 1)
Gary Hughes – King Arthur (Tracks 2, 3 and 10)
Lana Lane – Queen Guinevere (Track 3)
Danny Vaughn – Lancelot (Tracks 4 and 7)
Irene Jansen – Morgana (Track 5)
Bob Catley – Merlin (Tracks 6 and 9)
Sean Harris – Sir Galahad (Track 8)

Musicians-The Players 

Gary Hughes – guitar, piano, keyboards, backing vocals and programming
Chris Francis – guitars
John Halliwell – guitars
Steve McKenna – Bass guitars
Greg Morgan – drums and percussion
Arjen Lucassen – keyboards (Track 1)
Paul Hodson – piano and keyboards (Track 6)
Graham Woodcock – keyboards (Track 8)
Jason Thanos – backing vocals
Damian Wilson – backing vocals

Production 
Mixing – Pete Coleman
Engineer – Gary Hughes
Additional Engineering – Pete Coleman, Audu Obaje, Arjen Lucassen, Erik Norlander, Billy Churchill and Jason Thanos

External links 
Heavy Harmonies page

2003 albums
Arthurian music
Music based on works
Gary Hughes albums
Albums produced by Gary Hughes
Frontiers Records albums